Saens can refer to:

 Camille Saint-Saëns (1835–1921), French Romantic composer
 Sidonius of Saint-Saëns (7th century A.D.), Irish-born French monk and Roman Catholic Church saint

See also
 Sáenz (disambiguation)